The 2022–23 Texas State Bobcats men's basketball team represented Texas State University in the 2022–23 NCAA Division I men's basketball season. The Bobcats, led by third-year head coach Terrence Johnson, played their home games at Strahan Arena in San Marcos, Texas as members of the Sun Belt Conference.

Previous season
The Bobcats finished the 2020–21 season 21–8, 12–3 in Sun Belt play to win the regular season championship. They lost in the quarterfinals of the Sun Belt tournament to Louisiana. As a regular season champion who did not win their conference tournament, they received an automatic bid to the National Invitation Tournament where they lost in the first round to North Texas.

Offseason

Departures

Incoming transfers

Recruiting classes

2022 recruiting class

2023 recruiting class

Preseason

Preseason Sun Belt Conference poll 
The Bobcats were picked to finish in second place in the conference's preseason poll. Senior guard Mason Harrell was named to the preseason All-SBC First Team.

Roster

Schedule and results

|-
!colspan=12 style=| Exhibition

|-
!colspan=12 style=| Non-conference regular season

|-
!colspan=12 style=| Sun Belt Conference regular season

|-
!colspan=12 style=| Sun Belt tournament

Source

References

Texas State Bobcats men's basketball seasons
Texas State Bobcats
Texas State Bobcats men's basketball
Texas State Bobcats men's basketball